The 1895 Pacific Tigers football team represented the University of the Pacific as an independent during the 1895 college football season.  In their first game in program history, the Tigers tied San Jose State 6 to 6 in January 1896 (the game took place during the 1895 academic year however, so that is the year it is represented in).

Schedule

References

Pacific
Pacific Tigers football seasons
College football undefeated seasons
College football winless seasons
Pacific Tigers football